Alexander (Sándor) Pituk (October 26, 1904 in Banská Štiavnica – April 30, 2002 in Banská Štiavnica) was a Slovak and Hungarian chess problem composer and judge.

He resided all his life in Banská Štiavnica and worked as a carpenter. He was appointed an International Judge of Chess Compositions and was awarded the FIDE Master for Chess Composition and the title of Honorary Master of Chess Composition. He is author of 584 compositions (60 of them award-winners). His brother József Viktorián Pituk (1906–1991) was an established painter in Budapest.

External links
Pituk's page on Juraj Lorinc's website
Alexander Pituk: Chess Compositions I 1927-1961
Alexander Pituk: Chess Compositions II 1962-2002

1904 births
2002 deaths
People from Banská Štiavnica
Hungarians in Slovakia
International Judges of Chess Compositions
Chess composers